Ecuador Highway 35 (E-35), officially named "Troncal de la Sierra" (Highland's Road) but colloquially known as "La Panamericana", is a primary highway in Ecuador. This road is Ecuador's portion of the Pan-American Highway. It connects all the cities and towns from the Sierra region, from Tulcán at the north (border with Colombia), passing through Quito, the country's capital, to the south border with Peru. Part of this highway is a toll road administered by Panavial, a private concessionary. The road condition is quite good, but it mostly goes through mountains and it has some bad trails around the province of Cañar (center-south of the country), making it a relatively dangerous road to travel on.

035